Aphaenops abodiensis is a species of beetle in the subfamily Trechinae. It was described by Dupre in 1988.

References

abodiensis
Beetles described in 1988